Cheremisino is a rural locality (a village) in Kovarditskoye Rural Settlement, Muromsky District, Vladimir Oblast, Russia. The population was 80 as of 2010. There are 2 streets.

Geography 
Cheremisino is located on the Ilevna River, 13 km southwest of Murom (the district's administrative centre) by road. Zhemchuzhino is the nearest rural locality.

References 

Rural localities in Muromsky District
Muromsky Uyezd